Christopher L. McKenna (born October 18, 1977) is an American actor. He is best known for his roles in a number of television series.

Early life
Chris was born in Queens, New York.

Career
McKenna is known to daytime television audiences for his portrayal of Joey Buchanan on ABC's daytime soap opera One Life to Live from 1990 to 1993. McKenna is also known for playing the lead role in the grim 2003 film King of the Ants, a role which earned him critical acclaim.

On October 22, 2000, Chris played Greg, a college jock who wants to join the Phi Iota Gamma fraternity in the television drama Touched by an Angel on CBS.

Filmography

Film

Television

Video games

References

External links
 

American male soap opera actors
1977 births
Living people